Walter Köberle (born 13 January 1949 in Kaufbeuren) is an ice hockey player who played for the West German national team. He won a bronze medal at the 1976 Winter Olympics.

References

External links
 
 
 
 

1949 births
Düsseldorfer EG players
ESV Kaufbeuren players
Ice hockey players at the 1976 Winter Olympics
Living people
Medalists at the 1976 Winter Olympics
Olympic bronze medalists for West Germany
Olympic ice hockey players of West Germany
Olympic medalists in ice hockey
People from Kaufbeuren
Sportspeople from Swabia (Bavaria)
West German ice hockey forwards